Gmina Ruja is a rural gmina (administrative district) in Legnica County, Lower Silesian Voivodeship, in south-western Poland.

Neighbouring gminas
Gmina Ruja is bordered by the gminas of Kunice, Legnickie Pole, Malczyce, Prochowice and Wądroże Wielkie.

Villages
The gmina contains the villages of Dzierżkowice, Janowice, Komorniki, Lasowice, Polanka, Rogoźnik, Ruja, Strzałkowice, Tyniec Legnicki, Usza and Wągrodno.

Twin towns – sister cities

Gmina Ruja is twinned with:
 Liebschützberg, Germany

References

Ruja
Legnica County